Hryhir Mykhaylovych Tiutiunnyk (1931–1980) was a Ukrainian writer, brother of Hryhoriy Tiutiunnyk.

Awards and recognition
1980: Lesya Ukrainka Literary Prize of the Ukrainian SSR
1989: Shevchenko National Prize
Memorial plaque on a house on Andriivskyi Descent St. in Kyiv

Books
 Тютюнник Г. М. Зав'язь: Оповідання / Г. М. Тютюнник. – К.: Молодь, 1966. – 158 с.: іл.
 Тютюнник Г. М. Деревій: Повість та оповідання / Г. М. Тютюнник. – К.: Молодь, 1969. – 180 с.
 Тютюнник Г. М. Ласочка: Оповідання / Г. М. Тютюнник; Іл. Я. Левича. – К.: Веселка, 1970. – 20 с.
 Тютюнник Г. М. Лісова сторожка: Оповідання / Г. М. Тютюнник; Іл. Я. Левича.  – К.: Веселка, 1971. – 29 с.: іл.
 Тютюнник Г. М. Батьківські пороги: Оповідання, спогади / Г. М. Тютюнник. – К.: Молодь, 1972. – 176 с.: іл.
 Тютюнник Г. М. Тысячелистник: Рассказы / Г. М. Тютюнник; Авториз. пер. с укр. Н. Дангуловой; Ил. Н. Т. Борисовой. – М.: Сов. писатель, 1972. – 216 с.: ил.
 Тютюнник Г. М. Степова казка: Оповідання: Для дошк. та мол. шк.. віку  / Г. М. Тютюнник; Мал. Я. Левич. – К.: Веселка, 1973. – 24 с.
 Тютюнник Г. М. Лесная сторожка: Рассказы: [Для дошк. возраста] / Г. М. Тютюнник; Пер. с укр. Н. Шевченко. – М.: Дет. литература, 1974. – 48 с.: ил.
 Тютюнник Г. М. Однокрил: Оповідання / Г. М. Тютюнник. – К.: Веселка, 1974. –37 с.
 Тютюнник Г. М. Деревій / Г. М. Тютюнник; Перекл. Г. Райаметс та А. Яаксоо; Вступ. ст. П. Засенка. – Таллін: Періодика, 1974. – 92 с. (естонською мовою)
 Тютюнник Г. М. Крайнебо: Оповідання / Г. М. Тютюнник. – К.: Молодь, 1975. – 128 с.
 Тютюнник Г. М. Отчие пороги: Повесть и рассказы / Г. М. Тютюнник; Авториз. пер. с укр. Н. Дангуловой; Послесл. Б. Олейника; Худож. С. Соколов. – М.: Молодая гвардия, 1975. – 272 с.: ил.
 Тютюнник Г. М. Климко: Повість: [Для мол. шк.. віку] / Г. М. Тютюнник; Іл. В. Євдокименка. – К.: Веселка, 1976. – 87 с.: іл.
 Тютюнник Г. М. Коріння: Оповідання. Повість / Г. М. Тютюнник; Іл. І. М. Гаврилюка. – К.: Дніпро, 1978. – 294 с.: іл.
 Тютюнник Г. М. Вогник далеко в степу: Казка, оповідання, повісті: Для мол. шк.. віку / Г. М. Тютюнник; Худож. В. Євдокименка. – К.: Веселка, 1979. – 182 с.: іл.
 Тютюнник Г. М. Облога / Г. М. Тютюнник; Перекл. А. Богданський. – Варшава: Іскри, 1979. – 124 с. (in Polish)
 Тютюнник Г. М. В сутінки: Оповідання / Г. М. Тютюнник; Перекл. Р. Дворжакової-Жяранової, Ю. Андрійчик; Упоряд. та післямова Р. Жидліцького. – Кошіце: Східнослов. вид-во, 1979. – 279 с. (словацькою мовою)
 Тютюнник Г. М. Климко: Повесть / Г. М. Тютюнник; Пер. с укр. Н.Шевченко. – М.: Детская література, 1980. – 63 с.
 Тютюнник Г. М. Деревій: Оповідання і повісті / Г. М. Тютюнник; Упоряд., перекл., авторка передмови “Моряк із Шилівки” П. Аксенова. – Пловдів: Хр. Г. Данов, 1980. – 172 с. (in Bulgarian)
 Тютюнник Г. М. Климко: Казки, оповідання, повісті / Г. М. Тютюнник; Передм. М. Слабошпицького. Вічна загадка любові. – К.: Веселка, 1981. – 189 с.
 Тютюнник Г. М. Климко: Повість / Г. М. Тютюнник. – Вільнюс: Вага, 1981. – 87 с. (in Lithuanian)
 Тютюнник Г. М. Вибрані твори: Оповідання. Повісті / Г. М. Тютюнник; Передм. Б. Олійника. – К.: Дніпро, 1981. – 607 с.: портр.
 Тютюнник Г. М. Холодная мята: Повесть и рассказы / Г. М. Тютюнник; Авториз. пер. с укр. Н. Дангуловой; Худож. А. Соколов. – М.: Сов. писатель, 1981. – 335 с.: ил.
 Тютюнник Г. М. Холодная мята: Повесть. Рассказы / Г. М. Тютюнник;  Авториз. пер. с укр. Н. Дангуловой; Послесл. В. Мельника; Худож. С. Хализов. – М.: Известия, 1981. – 379 с.: ил.
 Тютюнник Г. М. Степова казка / Г. М. Тютюнник. – К.: Веселка, 1982. – 32 с.
 Тютюнник Г. М. Климко: Повість / Г. М. Тютюнник; Пер. з укр. М. Дубенецького. – Мінськ: Юнацтва, 1982. – 63 с. (in Belarusian)
 Тютюнник Г. М. Климко: Повість / Г. М. Тютюнник; Пер. І. Колінько. – Берлін: Вид-во дит. літ., 1982. – 87 с. (in German)
 Тютюнник Г. М. Огонек далеко в степи: Рассказы и повести / Г. М. Тютюнник; Авториз. пер. с укр. Н. Дангуловой; Предисл. О. Гончара. – М.: Молодая гвардия, 1982. – 352 с.: ил.
 Тютюнник Г. М. Климко: Оповідання. Повісті / Г. М. Тютюнник; Худож. О. П. Никифоров. – К.: Рад. школа, 1984. – 272с.: іл.
 Тютюнник Г. М. Твори: У 2 кн. / Г. М. Тютюнник; Упоряд. А. Шевченко; Фот. В. Білоуса, Д. Чередниченка – К.: Молодь, 1984-1985. – Кн. 1: Оповідання / Передмова О. Гончар. Живописець правди. –1984. – 328 с., іл.; Кн. 2: Повісті / Післямова А. Шевченка Талант любові: Життєвий і творчий шлях Григорія Тютюнника. – 1985. – 328 с.: іл.
 Тютюнник Г. М. Ласочка: Оповідання / Г. М. Тютюнник. – К.: Веселка, 1987. – 14 с.
 Тютюнник Г. М. Огонек далеко в степи: Сказки, рассказы, повести / Г. М. Тютюнник; Пер. с укр. Н. Шевченко; Рис. В. Евдокименко. – К: Веселка, 1986. – 200 с.
 Тютюнник Г. М. Завязь: Повесть, рассказы / Г. М. Тютюнник;  Авториз. пер. с укр. Н. Дангуловой;  Худож. О. В. Бичко. – К.: Дніпро, 1988. – 335 с.: ил.
 Тютюнник Г. М. Климко: Повісті: Для мол. та серед. шк. віку / Г. М. Тютюнник; Худож. В. Савадов. – К.: Веселка, 1989. – 164 с.: кольор. іл.
 Тютюнник Г. М. Повести и рассказы / Авториз. пер. с укр. Н. Дангуловой. – М.: Сов. писатель, 1989. – 715 с.
 Тютюнник Г. М. Степова казка: Повісті, оповідання, казки: Для мол. та серед. шк. віку / Г. М. Тютюнник; Упоряд. Л. В. Тютюнник; Передм. “З вірою в любов і милосердя” М. Слабошпицького; Худож. В. Євдокименко. – К.: Веселка, 1989. – 300 с.: кольор. іл.
 Тютюнник Г. М. Тайна вечеря: Повісті й новели / Г. М. Тютюнник; Пер. з укр. В. Левицьки, Й. Георгіце та ін.; Передм. А. Шевченка. – Кишинів: Література артістіка, 1989. – 413 с. (in Moldovan)
 Тютюнник Г. М. Степова казка. Казки, оповідання, повісті: Для мол. та серед. шк. віку / Г. М. Тютюнник; Упоряд. Л. Тютюнник; Передм. М. Слабошпицького; Худож. В. Євдокименко. – 2-ге вид. – К.: Веселка, 1993. – 307 с.: іл., портр.
 Тютюнник Г. М. Климко: Повість: Для дітей середн. віку / Г. М. Тютюнник. – К.: Молодь, 1995. – 164 с.: іл.
 Тютюнник Г. М. Вибрані твори: Оповідання, повісті / Г. М. Тютюнник. – Дніпропетровськ: Січ, 2000. – 450 с.
 Тютюнник Г. М. Смерть кавалера: Повісті і оповідання / Г. М. Тютюнник; Передмова А. Шевченка. Щастя й злощастя Григора Тютюнника. – К.: Махаон, 2001. – 254 с.
 Тютюнник Г. М. Облога: Вибрані твори / Григір Тютюнник; Передм., упорядкув. та приміт. В. Дончика. – К.: Унів. вид-во ПУЛЬСАРИ, 2004. – 584 с.
 Тютюнник Григір. Облога: Вибрані твори / Григір Тютюнник; Передм., упорядкув. та приміт. В. Дончика. – 3-тє вид. – К.: Унів. вид-во ПУЛЬСАРИ, 2005. – 832 с.

References

1931 births
1980 suicides
Ukrainian writers
National University of Kharkiv alumni
Suicides by hanging in the Soviet Union
1980 deaths